ionCube Ltd. is a software company based in Hersden, Kent in the United Kingdom.

ionCube was founded in 2002, and introduced tools to prevent the source code of software written using the PHP programming language from being viewed, changed, and run on unlicensed computers. The encoding technology grew out of earlier work on the PHP Accelerator project, and at first launch included an online encoding service where PHP scripts can be uploaded and an encoded version downloaded in return, and a command line tool for Linux soon after. The tools use the technique of compiling to bytecode prior to encoding so that source code is eliminated, and runtime overheads are reduced. A PHP extension called the ionCube Loader handles the reading and execution of encoded files at run time. Unlike CPU's such as 8086, where compiled code from many years ago continues to run on its derivatives today, the virtual machine instruction set of PHP has changed over time. The ionCube Loader uses the technique of on the fly patching of compiled code in memory to achieve back compatibility of 
running older files on newer versions of PHP.

The encoding products were subsequently ported to FreeBSD, Microsoft Windows and Mac OS X, and the range of products expanded to offer additional features such as product licensing and encryption of non-PHP files. In July 2004 a Windows GUI was introduced, no longer requiring use of the command line for Windows users.

In 2004, ionCube introduced their Package Foundry product, IPF, for Linux and Windows. IPF allows web applications to be packaged as a Windows executable installer that can automatically deploy a web application to a remote server, as well as performing various installation and configuration tasks, and launching the browser on the main page of the installed application.

ionCube also produce a product called the Bundler. Unrelated to PHP, the Bundler is a Windows and Linux tool to produce self-extracting archives for Windows.

In December 2010 ionCube released version 7.0 of their Encoder, including support for the PHP 5.3 language.

In May 2013 ionCube released version 8.0 with support for encoding the PHP 5.4 language. This was followed by an 8.1 release in October 2013 with changes including an updated GUI, enhanced security and a feature to assist selecting optimal security settings. February 2014 saw the release of Encoder 8.2 with some new features, and most notably a GUI for OS X users. As of April 18, 2014, Encoder 8.3 was released with support for encoding PHP 5.5 language features.

In May 2015 ionCube released version 9 with support for PHP 5.6 language syntax and new security features such as decrypting compiled code using algorithmically runtime generated keys rather than static keys, followed by version 10 with support for PHP 7.1 in August 2017.

Version 11 was subsequently released to support PHP 7.4 in October 2021 and version 12 for PHP 8.1 in August 2022.

ionCube24 

In Q1 2015, ionCube introduced a service called ionCube24 offering realtime malware protection for PHP websites. ionCube24 uses the ionCube Loader to monitor and block any unexpected PHP code, as might be introduced by a software vulnerability exploit, before it executes. Alongside the security aspect of ionCube24, it also provides realtime PHP and Javascript error reporting, along with server monitoring from various regions including Asia, North America and Europe.

References

External links 
 

PHP software
Software companies of the United Kingdom
Companies established in 2002
2002 establishments in England